Bir Zamanlar Osmanlı: Kıyam (Once Upon A Time In The Ottoman Empire: Rebellion) is a Turkish historical television series about assassins, the tulip period and the Patrona Halil rebellion in the 18th-century Ottoman Empire. It was originally broadcast on Turkey's state television TRT.

Synopsis 
In 1711, the Ottoman Empire defeated the Russian Empire, but the Ottoman Empire then entered a period of decline. Military activities were replaced by entertainments at night. This situation upset folk people and Janissaries. Patrona Halil's brother was executed by the order of the Grand Vizier at that time. Patrona Halil became very angry. He wanted to avenge his brother.

Cast

Main characters

International broadcasts

References

Turkish drama television series
Television series about the Ottoman Empire
2012 Turkish television series debuts
2012 Turkish television series endings
Turkish Radio and Television Corporation original programming
Television shows set in Istanbul
Television series produced in Istanbul